The 1991 East Texas State Lions football team represented East Texas State University—now known as Texas A&M University–Commerce—as a member of the Lone Star Conference (LSC) during the 1991 NCAA Division II football season.  Led by sixth-year head coach Eddie Vowell, the Lions compiled an overall record of  8–4–1 with a mark of 4–1–1  in conference play, tying for second place in the LSC. They advanced to the NCAA Division II Football Championship playoffs, where they beat  in the first round before falling to eventual national champion Pittsburg State in the quarterfinals. East Texas State played their home games at Memorial Stadium in Commerce, Texas.

Schedule

Awards

All-Americans
Dwayne Phorne, Offensive Line, First Team
Eric Turner, Defensive Back, First Team
Micah Haley, Defensive Line, Second Team
Billy Watkins, Placekicker, Second Team
Jim White, Center, Second Team
Bobby Bounds, Quarterback, Honorable Mention
Curtis Buckley, Safety, Honorable Mention

All-Lone Star Conference

LSC Superlatives
Offensive Back of the Year: Bobby Bounds
Defensive Back of the Year: Eric Turner

LSC First Team
Bobby Bounds, Quarterback
Joe Brookins, Defensive Back
Curtis Buckley, Strong Safety
Micah Haley, Defensive Line
Brian Harp, Wide Receiver
Dwayne Phorne, Offensive Tackle 
Eddie Tenison, Wide Receiver  
Eric Turner, Cornerback
Billy Watkins, Kicker
Jim White, Center

LSC Second Team
David Chapman, Fullback
David Gaskamp, Offensive Guard
Finis Turner, Safety

LSC Honorable Mention
Earl Bell, Offensive Tackle
Duane Hicks, Defensive Tackle
Jimmy Hooker, Strong Safety
Mike Meador, Quarterback
Billy Minor, Wide Receiver 
Kevin Oblander, Defensive Line
Gary Perry, Running Back
Aaron Postert, Tight End
Joseph Showell, Offensive Tackle
Terrance Toliver, Linebacker

References

East Texas State
Texas A&M–Commerce Lions football seasons
East Texas State Lions football